Sachsenhausen (Nordbahn) station is a railway station in the Sachsenhausen district in the town of Oranienburg, located in the Oberhavel district in Brandenburg, Germany.

References

Railway stations in Brandenburg
Buildings and structures in Oberhavel
Railway stations in Germany opened in 1905
1905 establishments in Prussia